Kamaz or KAMAZ is a Russian manufacturer of trucks and engines.

Kamaz may also refer to:

KAMAZ-7850, a new unified family of wheeled very heavy load transporters being developed by KAMAZ for the Russian Ministry of Defence
KamAZ "Shuttle", a bus with the autopilot on electricity, jointly developed by the AERI and the Kama Automobile Plant
Kamaz Typhoon, a family of Russian multi-functional, modular, armoured, mine-resistant MRAP vehicles
Kamaz Master, Russian motorsport team

See also
List of Kamaz vehicles
FC KAMAZ Naberezhnye Chelny, Russian football club
KAMAZ Stadium, a multi-purpose stadium in Naberezhnye Chelny, Russia